The 1999 Japan Open Tennis Championships was a tennis tournament played on outdoor hard courts at the Ariake Coliseum in Tokyo, Japan that was part of the International Series Gold of the 1999 ATP Tour. The tournament was held from April 12 through April 18, 1999.

Seeds
Champion seeds are indicated in bold text while text in italics indicates the round in which those seeds were eliminated.

Draw

Finals

Top half

Bottom half

References

Doubles